The Postal Building is a building located in downtown Portland, Oregon, that is listed on the National Register of Historic Places.

See also
 National Register of Historic Places listings in Southwest Portland, Oregon

References

External links

1901 establishments in Oregon
Commercial buildings completed in 1901
National Register of Historic Places in Portland, Oregon
Post office buildings on the National Register of Historic Places in Oregon
Renaissance Revival architecture in Oregon
Southwest Portland, Oregon
Portland Historic Landmarks